Patrick Viriamu is a Tahitian paracanoeist from French Polynesia who has competed since the late 2000s. He won a gold medal in the V-1 200 m LTA, TA, A event at the 2010 ICF Canoe Sprint World Championships in Poznań.

References
2010 ICF Canoe Sprint World Championships men's V-1 200 m LTA, TA, A results. – accessed 20 August 2010.

Living people
Tahitian male canoeists
Year of birth missing (living people)
ICF Canoe Sprint World Championships medalists in paracanoe
LTA classification paracanoeists
Paracanoeists of Tahiti